Rules! is an iOS game by German indie developer Marcel-André Casasola Merkle and published by TheCodingMonkeys. It was released on August 6, 2014.

Gameplay
Players are given a board of creatures with various features (colour, accessories etc.) and are given a rule regarding them in Level 1. All previous rules are relevant in later levels so as these accumulate, the game becomes more difficult.

Critical reception
The game has a Metacritic rating of 88% based on 8 critic reviews.

Gamezebo wrote " Rules! is that sort of lightning in a bottle that only comes along every so often. I’d rank it right up there with Threes!, and not just because both games so gleefully abuse exclamation points. " IGN Italia said "Rules! is one of that game that you can’t simply quit: it’s amazing to look and to play, engaging and challenging, even brutal if your brain isn’t trained enough. Follow the Rules has never looked so good. " TouchArcade wrote "It's certainly worth checking out, but be warned: it might make you feel your age, even if you're not all that old. "  ArcadeSushi said "Rules! provides the unique experience of further developing hand-eye coordination and memory skills in each person who plays it, while giving the added bonus of plain-old having fun. " Apple'N'Apps wrote "Rules! is an excellently crafted new puzzle idea that will no doubt get you to absolutely love following the rules. " PocketGamerUK said "A delightfully constructed memory test that grows in complexity and appeal the deeper in you go." 148Apps compared the game to Simon Says, writing "Follow the rules to the letter in order to win in this simple yet tough memory game. "

References

IOS games
IOS-only games
2014 video games
Puzzle video games
Video games developed in Germany